Fernando Rodríguez (born 8 February 1963) is a Peruvian backstroke, freestyle and medley swimmer. He competed in three events at the 1984 Summer Olympics.

References

External links
 

1963 births
Living people
Peruvian male backstroke swimmers
Peruvian male freestyle swimmers
Peruvian male medley swimmers
Olympic swimmers of Peru
Swimmers at the 1984 Summer Olympics
Pan American Games competitors for Peru
Swimmers at the 1987 Pan American Games
Place of birth missing (living people)
20th-century Peruvian people